The Law of the People's Republic of China, officially referred to as the Socialist legal system with Chinese characteristics, is the legal regime of China, with the separate legal traditions and systems of mainland China, Hong Kong, and Macau.

China's legal system is largely a civil law system, although found its root in Great Qing Code and various historical system, largely reflecting the influence of Continental European legal systems, especially the German civil law system in the 19th and early 20th centuries. Hong Kong and Macau, the two Special Administrative Regions, although required to observe the constitution and the basic laws and the power of the National People's Congress, are able to largely maintain their legal systems from colonial times.

During the Maoist period (1949–1978), the government had a hostile attitude towards a formalized legal system, because Mao and the Chinese Communist Party (CCP) "saw the law as creating constraints upon their power." The legal system was attacked as a counter-revolutionary institution, and the concept of law itself was not accepted. Courts were closed, law schools were shut down and lawyers were forced to change professions or be sent to the countryside.

There was an attempt in the mid-1950s to import a socialist legal system based on that of the Soviet Union. But from the start of the Anti-Rightist Campaign in 1957–1959 to the end of the Cultural Revolution around 1976, the PRC lacked most of the features of what could be described as a formal legal system.

This policy was changed in 1979, and Deng Xiaoping and the CCP put into place an "open door" policy, which took on a utilitarian policy to the reconstruction of the social structure and legal system where the law has been used as useful tool to support economic growth. Since then, China has continued to develop a formal legal system. A huge increase in the amount of legislation passed and the increased focus on implementing and enforcing law has allowed for a more stable legal environment compared to the Maoist period. The country is currently in a period of transition as its legal system continues to develop. Scholar Daniel C.K. Chow describes the current system as following "rule by law" rather than "rule of law."

History 

China has a tradition of adopting civil law systems. During the Qing Dynasty, the Chinese government hired Japanese legal experts to copy legal systems from Japan in order to modernise the Chinese legal system. This stemmed from the German civil law system. After the establishment of the Republic of China in 1911, the Chinese government maintained the civil law system. Although the CCP abolished all legal systems of the ROC after 1949, its legal system was deeply influenced by the legal system of the Soviet Union, which could also be regarded as a civil law system.

The development of the current legal system dates from the late 1970s, after the end of the Cultural Revolution. After more than 30 years of endeavour, the People's Republic of China has established, through enactments by the National People's Congress and its Standing Committee, a rather complete legal system with constitution, civil and commercial law, criminal law, administrative law, economic law, procedural law, etc.

In the 2000s, the Weiquan movement began in the PRC, seeking to advance citizens' rights partly by petitioning for enforcement of existing laws, and partly through activism. Lawyers in the movement have seen some court victories, but in other cases they and their families have been ostracized and even tortured for their activities.

Sources of law 

The highest and ultimate source of legal norms in the PRC is nominally the Constitution of the People's Republic of China. It establishes the framework and principles of government, and lists the fundamental rights and duties of Chinese citizens. In practice, however, although these "fundamental rights" include "freedom of speech, of the press, of assembly, of association, of procession and of demonstration" the enforcement of these rights and other elements of the Constitution are subject to the discretion of the Communist Party's leadership.

Unlike some civil law jurisdictions such as Germany, China does not systematically lay down general principles in its constitution which all administrative regulations and rules must follow. The principles of legislation and the validity and priority of law, rule and administrative regulations are instead listed in the Legislation Law, constitutional provisions, basic laws and laws enacted by the National People's Congress and its standing committee, regulations issued by the State Council and its departments, local laws and regulations, autonomous-zone regulations, legal explanations and treaty norms are all in theory incorporated into domestic law immediately upon promulgation.

Signed international treaties are in practice automatically incorporated into PRC law, and they are superior to the relevant stipulations of PRC laws. However, the PRC reserves the right to make reservations regarding provisions of a treaty.

Unlike common law jurisdictions, there is no strict precedential concept for case law and no principle of stare decisis. In addition, there is no case or controversy requirement that would require the Supreme People's Court to limit its decisions to actual cases, and the SPC does issue general interpretations of the law. In practice, lower people's court judges attempt to follow the interpretations of the laws decided by the Supreme People's Court. In addition, unlike common law jurisdictions, higher courts have the power of supervision and guidance, which means that on their own initiative they can reopen a case that has been decided at a lower level.

Courts in the PRC do not have a general power of judicial review which enables them to strike down legislation. However under the Administrative Procedure Law of the People's Republic of China, they do have authority to invalidate specific acts of the government. In cases where there is a conflict of laws, the process to resolve this conflict is outlined in the Legislation Law of the People's Republic of China, in which an interpretation is requested by the legislative body that is responsible for the law. This process has been criticized both by Western and Chinese legal scholars for being unwieldy and for not allowing for judicial independence and separation of powers. At the same time, the counterargument has been made that resolving legal conflicts is primarily a legislative activity and not a judicial one.

Finally, courts outside of the special autonomous regions, including the Supreme People's Court, do not have jurisdiction over the Hong Kong and Macau SAR's; although, the Standing Committee of the National People's Congress does have and has used its authority to interpret the Basic Law of Hong Kong.

Varieties of law 

PRC governmental directives exist in a hierarchy, which is defined by the Legislation Law of the People's Republic of China. The hierarchy of regulations are

 The Constitution of the People's Republic of China
 National laws (国家法律 guójiā fǎlǜ), which are issued by the National People's Congress
 Administrative regulations, which are issued by the State Council
 Local decrees, which are issued by local People's Congresses
 Administrative and local rules, which are issued by an administrative agency or by a local People's Government

Major areas of law are substantive laws and procedural laws. The former include administrative law, criminal law, civil law or business law, and economic law. These are separated into different branches. For example, contract law is considered a branch of civil law. The latter includes civil procedure law, criminal procedure law and administrative procedure law.

Civil law and Civil Procedure Law

In 1986 the National People's Congress adopted the General Principles of the Civil Law of the People's Republic of China, which helped clarify the scope of the civil law. Article 2 of the document states that the civil law governs personal and property relationships between natural persons and legal persons having equal status. It covers a wide range of topics, including the General Principles, marriage law, property law, contract law, copyright law, and trademark law. From the point of view of some scholars, business law, such as corporation law, bankruptcy law, insurance law, and law on negotiable instruments, is distinguished from civil law.

Up until 2021, the PRC did not have a single civil code in force. In its absence, the National People's Congress promulgated Marriage Law, Adoption Law, Succession Law, Contract Law, Law of Rights in Rem, Law of Tort Liability. The first part of the future Civil Code was General Provisions of Civil Law (《民法总则》) adopted in 2017, which was based on General Principles of Civil Law (《民法通则》) adopted in 1986.

On May 28, 2020, the Civil Code of the People's Republic of China was adopted at the third session of the 13th National People's Congress. It came into force on January 1, 2021, on which day Marriage Law, Succession Law, General Principles of Civil Law, Adoption Law, Guarantee Law, Contract Law, Property Law, Tort Law, and General Provisions of Civil Law were repealed. Since the Civil Code of the People's Republic China does not include provisions regarding intellectual property, company, or labour, its promulgation did not affect Trademark Law, Patent Law, Copyright Law, Company Law, Partnership Enterprise Law, Labour Law, or Labour Contract Law, all of which remained in force as of 2021. 

The Civil Procedure Law of the People's Republic of China was first adopted in 1991 and subsequently amended in 2007, 2012, 2017 and 2021. Civil procedural law advocates the principle of 'open trial' - a system in which the second instance is the final hearing, although a trial supervision system exists in civil litigation which will allow a limited number of cases being tried by the third instance. Enforcing judgments can prove particularly difficult.

Criminal law and Criminal Procedure Law

Criminal Law

China's first post-1949 substantive and procedural Criminal Code was enacted in 1979. The 1979 Code followed the release of a new Constitution in 1978, and the fall of the 'Gang of Four' in 1976.

Chinese Criminal Code went through a major restructuring in 1997, all subsequent revisions were amendments on the 1997 version of the Criminal Code of the People's Republic of China. 

The present Criminal Code, The Criminal Law of the People's Republic of China (中华人民共和国刑法) is the product of extensive revisions, most recently passed on December 26, 2020 (the 11th Amendment to enact on March 1, 2021) which featured changes in response to recent social changes, some notable changes included the lowering of age that bears criminal responsibility to 16, and in the case of "committing crimes of intentional homicide, intentional harm", offenders of 14 to 16 of age would also bear criminal responsibility.

Noteworthy features of criminal law in China include the requirement that crimes and criminal sanctions may only be governed by national laws (as opposed to provincial laws or ministerial regulations). This rule is set out in Article 8 of the Legislation Law of the People's Republic of China (中华人民共和国立法法).

The harshness of criminal law in China is under heavy criticism or strong support, especially the insistence on capital punishment for many crimes. China accounts for the biggest number of criminals executed in the world per year, which has raised great concern among different human rights groups and international organizations.

Criminal Procedure Law

This Criminal Procedure Law of China (中华人民共和国刑事诉讼法) provides for all phases of the criminal process. This is distinct from the system of administrative punishments (including detention for periods of multiple years) and procedures which are governed under a separate system of laws and regulations. The criminal procedure law governs the conduct of investigations, including pre-trial detention, interrogation, surveillance, prosecution (by an institution called the "procuratorate") and the conduct of trials/the defense of the accused. However, the independence of the courts and institutions involved in the investigation, prosecution and trial of criminal offences in China remains challenged by the structure of the PRC's government and its organs. One example of the structural barriers to the independence of courts is the Chinese Communist Party political-legal committee system, by which "the Party has the power to instruct, monitor or scrutinize courts regarding specific decisions of individual cases or categories of cases that attract attention from the Party."

Administrative law and Administrative Procedure Law 
The State Council is authorized to promulgate administrative regulations, on social and economic sectors and affairs consistent with the laws adopted by the NPC and its Standing Committee. These laws include environmental protection law, regulations on taxation and customs, product quality law, and so on. In these areas, the central government and its organs are superior to other parties, such as enterprises and individuals, for they exercise the power of regulation.

The Administrative Procedure Law of the People's Republic of China (1989) allows legal persons to bring legal challenges against administrative actions. The types of administrative actions that can be challenged must be "concrete actions", which include: administrative punishments (such as detentions and fines), administrative coercive measures, interference with the operations of enterprises, refusal to take action or perform an obligation, unlawful demands for performance of duties, and violations of rights of the person or property rights. The review of state action is carried out in the local people's court. Court review of agency action is not permitted for state action involving national defense or foreign affairs. Moreover, the court cannot review administrative legislation.

As a matter of fact, although administrative litigation involving governments is on the rise due to citizens using legal measures to protect their property from government violation, it is still quite difficult for the court to give fair judgements or efficient execution, as the court's judges are appointed by the Communist Party and finance comes from the government.

Lawmaking and legislative authority 

There are two types of organs that are empowered to make legislative enactments. The first is referred to as "state-power organs" (国家权力机关), which take the form of the National People's Congress, its standing committee and local peoples' congresses of provinces, municipalities, and "metropolitans having some degree of autonomy" as designated by the State Council. Certain administrative organs (行政机关)—that is, the State Council, its departments and commissions, and local people's governments at the same level as the local people's congresses mentioned above, including the governments of provincial capitals—also have the power to make administrative rules and regulations under certain conditions.

In theory, legislation issued by administrative organs is subordinate to that issued by state-power organs. Enactments of administrative organs must not conflict with the Constitution or law. In addition, local people's governments must ensure that their enactments comply with those issued by the State Council and its subordinate departments.

The concept of delegation of power has yet to be fully developed in the PRC legal system. For example, because it is not customary to expressly delegate power to administrative bodies to issue specific regulatory documents, they are not drafted pursuant to any specific entrustment of power in the manner of a statutory authorization of the enactment of implementing regulations.

In drafting the new laws, the PRC has declined to copy any other legal system wholesale, and the general pattern has been to issue laws for a specific topic or location. Often laws are drafted on a trial basis, with the law being redrafted after several years. This process of creating a legal infrastructure piecemeal has led to judicial decisions having more precedential value than in most civil law jurisdictions. In formulating laws, the PRC has been influenced by a number of sources, including traditional Chinese views toward the role of law, the PRC's socialist background, the German-based law of the Republic of China on Taiwan, and the English-based common law used in Hong Kong.

The law of the United States has also been very influential particularly in the area of banking and securities law. Specifically, China has copied the separation between investment banking, commercial banking, and insurance, even after those walls were abolished in the United States, and large sections of the Securities Law of the People’s Republic of China have incorporated in legislation concepts copied from American securities law.

National People's Congress 

The highest legislative authority is the National People's Congress. It has the power to revise the Constitution and create major legal codes referred to as "basic laws" (基本法律 jīběn fǎlǜ). Apart from this, the NPC also enacts laws (法 fǎ) and decision (决定 juédìng). Decisions may contain legal norms in the form of amendments or supplements to laws. They are often used to delegate lawmaking authority to the State Council.

The nature of the selection delegates to the NPC has meant that popular input into lawmaking at this level is very limited. Because the delegates range from different fields and backgrounds, only some of them are legal professionals or practitioners. Without any formal legal education or knowledge, few of the delegates can make suggestions or give opinions on legislation. Thus, a fairly wide cross-section of the party and government at both central and local levels is given the opportunity to produce input. The NPC Legislative Affairs Commission (法制工作委员会 fǎzhìgōngzuò wěiyuánhuì) is the key organ that are responsible for the law drafting work. Since the 1990s, scholars and experts are increasingly entrusted by the NPC Legislative Affairs Commission to form drafting groups to prepare the first draft of the basic laws (this was the case for the Contract Law (1999), the Law of Rights in rem (2007), the Law of Tort Liability (2009) and the Law of the PRC on the Law Applicable to Foreign-related Civil Relations (2010)). The act of legislating is to some extent a game of interest groups.

The State Council 
The next tier of the PRC's legislative hierarchy—the State Council—is also elected by the NPC and is head of the nation's executive. It is empowered under Article 89 of the Constitution to "adopt administrative measures (办法 bànfǎ), enact administrative regulations (行政法规 xíngzhèng fǎguī) and issue decisions (决定 juédìng) and orders (命令 mìnglìng) in accordance with the Constitution and statutes." The State Council Legislative Affairs Office (国务院法制办 guówùyuàn fǎzhì bàn) is mainly responsible for the drafting of administrative regulations which are issued for the purpose of implementing laws.

Lawmaking at the local level 
Of the four levels of local administration in China (province, region/prefecture, county/district, township), only the provincial level possesses real lawmaking power. The Organic Law of Local People's Congresses and Local People's Governments allows congresses at the provincial, municipal, provincial capital and "quite big city" levels to enact their own regulations, called local regulations (地方性法规 dìfāngxìng fǎguì). Nevertheless, drafts of legislation must be approved by the provincial level congress before they can become law.

Judiciary 

The judge and prosecutor still are regarded as public servants. It is recognized that the quality of judges and prosecutors are lower than lawyers, but in the major cities, such as the provincial capital cities, the new recruited judges are with higher law degrees than ever before. In 2002, the unified State Judicial Exam (SJE) was introduced, partly to improve the quality of the judiciary. Any person who wants to work as a judge, prosecutor, or become a practicing lawyer or a public notary, will need to pass the SJE to obtain a Certificate of Legal Profession Qualification. Like in courts of imperial times, judges are also inquisitors who question witnesses, but unlike traditional courts, only evidence given in court is taken into account. Parties are permitted to engage agents ad litem who may be lawyers or any citizen approved by the court. A major concern with the modern court system is bribery of judges resulting from low salaries and financial dependence on local government. Though a great part of disputes that reach the courts still end in mediated rather than adjudicated outcomes, Chinese judges still apply formal laws and follow rules of civil procedure.

Since judges in China normally begin their careers as judges as opposed to first serving as lawyers, they may become judges at an unusually young age relative to most other countries.

People's courts 

Under the Organic Law of the People's Courts (1983), judicial power is exercised by the courts at four levels:
 basic people's courts (基层人民法院 jī céng rénmín fǎyuàn; also called "local" people's courts): Courts at county or district level. Tribunals may also be set up in accordance with local conditions.
 intermediate people's courts: Prefecture-level courts.
 higher people's courts: Provincial-level courts.
 the Supreme People's Court (or National Supreme Court, or Supreme Court)

The highest court in the judicial system is the Supreme People's Court in Beijing, directly responsible to the NPC and its Standing Committee. It supervises the administration of justice by the people's courts at various levels. There is also a Politics and Law Committee in CCP which is in charge of the direction and cooperation of court, procuratorate, police and ensure CCP's leadership over judicial issues.

Cases are decided within two instances of trial in the people's courts. This means that, from a judgement or order of first instance of a local people's court, a party may bring an appeal only once to the people's court at the next highest level, and the people's procuratorate may protest a court decision to the people's court at the next highest level. However, a limited number civil and commercial cases may, according to the Civil Procedure Law, be heard for the third time, a regime called trial supervision. Additionally, judgments or orders of first instance of the local people's courts at various levels become legally effective if, within the prescribed period for appeal, no party makes an appeal. Any judgments and orders rendered by the Supreme People's Courts as court of first instance shall become effective immediately.

In accordance with Article 11 of the Organic Law, "the people's courts at all levels shall set up judicial committees within the courts" in order to sum up judicial experience and to discuss important or difficult cases and other issues relating to the judicial works.

Professional and special courts 
Other special courts include military courts, maritime courts and railway courts. The military court, established within the People's Liberation Army, is the relatively closed adjudication institution in charge of hearing criminal cases involving servicemen. The maritime courts are located at the major sea and river port cities. They have jurisdiction over maritime cases and maritime trade cases of first instance. It ranks equivalent to an intermediate court in the judiciary hierarchy. The railway transport court deals with criminal cases and economic disputes relating to railway and transportation.

People's procuratorates 
Under Article 129 of the Constitution, people's procuratories are "the State organs for legal supervision". Its functions are defined by the Organic Law of the People's Procuratorates (1983).

The Supreme People's Procuratorate is set up at national level. The local people's procuratorates are divided into three tiers, as with the people's courts. Procuratorial committees are created inside the people's procuratorates at different levels. According to Article 3 of the Organic Law, "the procuratorial committee shall apply the system of democratic centralism and, under the direction of the chief procurator, hold discussions on important cases and other major issues".

The procuratorates are responsible for indict criminal suspects as public prosecutor.

Informal mediation 

Like in imperial times, resolving disputes in China has relied heavily on community mediation rather than litigation within a formal court system. Although a great number of disputes in China to this day are settled informally through community mediation, legal actions are increasingly resorted nowadays by ordinary people to resolve their disputes. Courts are overburdened in many parts of China (for instance, judges at the Basic People's Court in Chaoyang District and Haidian District in Beijing have an average caseload of 300-400 per year).Traditionally, the emphasis has been on compromise, maintaining social harmony, and establishing order. But unlike previous eras, there existed, notably in the first part of the Communist era, mass show trials and public criticisms to enforce the party line, establish party dominance, and make examples of certain values of society.

After the Communist Party took control, it institutionalized many of the existing informal community mediation systems into the party-state structure. Mediation Committees, staffed by five to eleven community members, were made part of larger Residents’ Committees and charged with settling disputes through peer pressure and conciliation.

The Communists established a formal court system based on the Soviet model following their victory, but ideological conflict between law specialists and cadres caused the system to break down. In the 1952 "three anti" (sān fǎn) and "five anti" (wǔ fǎn) movements, mass public trials with crowds of onlookers shouting criticisms resulted in the execution and detention of hundreds of thousands of "counterrevolutionaries" without employing the formal legal system. During the Cultural Revolution, the court system was abolished entirely and laws stopped being enacted. This resulted in community mediation systems taking on more importance. The People's Liberation Army was put in control of judging cases. Red Guard brigades often forced individuals to conduct self-criticisms and sent people to reeducation camps for being "reactionaries."

With the Deng Xiaoping reforms starting at the end of the 1970s, there has been a return to socialist legality. The judicial system has been resumed and a relatively complete legal system has been established through 30 years of legislation effort, despite the overall traditional impression of China in the Western countries. The practice of 1952-1976 related to court has been abandoned. China is now trying to develop a new regime of alternative dispute resolution (ADR).

Law enforcement 

The Ministry of Public Security is the principal police authority. It is responsible for maintaining social and public order, and also for conducting investigations and arrest of suspects in criminal cases. It maintains public order in accordance with the administrative power granted by law and through the police force. It can also settle civil disputes between citizens.

The People's Armed Police is a paramilitary force which is used in cases of serious disturbances.

The Ministry of State Security exists as a counterespionage organ and is also used to monitor and control perceived threats to the government and party.

Legal profession 
The Ministry of Justice of PRC governs the prison and Laogai, and it mainly focuses on regulation of the legal profession. Historically the legal profession has been insignificant in the PRC. In the late 1970s, there were no more than a couple of hundred practicing lawyers. Since the 1980s, as China's leadership became cognizant of the importance of the legal system and legal profession to advance economic development, training for lawyers dramatically increased. From 1986 to 1992, the number of lawyers in the country more than doubled from 21,500 to 45,000, and by 2008 had reached 143,000.

The foundation was laid by the Provisional Law on Lawyering in the PRC in 1980. In its early stages, law offices were called "legal counseling services" (法律顾问处 fǎlǜ gùwèn chǔ) and lawyers were regarded as "state legal workers". In 1986, the Chinese National Lawyer's Association was established in Beijing, followed by similar organizations around the rest of China. In the same year, the Ministry of Justice administered a unified national qualification exam for lawyers. This exam was superseded by the State Judicial Exam (SJE) in 2002. Various structures have been experimented within the establishment of law offices.

In May 1996, the Lawyers Law was enacted by the NPC. It acknowledged the developmental needs of the legal profession. The definition of a lawyer was finally changed from "state legal worker" to "a professional who legally obtains a Lawyer's Certificate and who provides the society with legal services". The law sets forth qualifications for practicing law; outlines a lawyer's professional capacity, rights and duties; rules for pro bono.

At present, there are more than 11,000 law firms in China, staffed by more than 118,000 lawyers. The practice of law has also gradually progressed into new areas such as finance, real estate, and to a lesser extent, human rights. Overall however, the size of the Chinese legal profession is still too small to meet the demands of growth and modernization. Moreover, in sensitive cases, lawyers still cannot play important roles and defend clients in a free way. Some of them were even tried on accusation of perjury as punishment.

Since the PRC's entry into the World Trade Organization, there has been progressive opening up of the legal service sector. A number of foreign law firms have entered the market, mostly specializing in cross-border business transactions, mergers and acquisitions, and copyright law.

As of 2012 an oath pledging loyalty to the leading role of the Chinese Communist Party is required of new and re-licensed Chinese lawyers:I swear to faithfully fulfill the sacred mission of legal workers in socialism with Chinese characteristics. I swear my loyalty to the motherland, to the people, to uphold the leadership of the Communist Party of China and the socialist system, and to protect the dignity of the Constitution and laws.司法部下发建立律师宣誓制度决定的通知 进入律师队伍必须进行宣誓  Ministry of Justice, P.R.C. accessed March 23, 2012

Legal education 
Over the last two decades, legal education has paralleled the growth of the legal profession. It is one of the most competitive academic disciplines in terms of university and college enrolment, and the number of judicial and legal training institutions continue to grow. The trend has been determined by a strong demand in the market for legal services, and the need to improve the professional quality of judges and prosecutors.

Chinese judicial and legal training facilities are divided into law schools, law universities 
and justice colleges; and specialized judicial and professional training centres.

Approximately 70% of practicing lawyers have university degrees, and 30% only have college diplomas. In March 2002, over 360,000 university or college graduates took part in a two-day State Judicial Exam (SJE). According to a recent report, only 7% passed.

University level 
At present, there are at least 80 law universities or law colleges, and many university-based law schools or law departments in PRC. Historically, the best-known ones are called "the Five Institutes and Four Departments (Simplified Chinese: 五院四系)". But some of the new law schools established in other top Chinese universities are developing very fast and become the top law schools now.

"The Five Institutes" are:
Beijing Institute of Political Science and Law, today known as China University of Political Science and Law, in Beijing.
Southwest Institute of Political Science and Law, today known as Southwest University of Political Science and Law, in Chongqing.
East China Institute of Politics and Law, today known as East China University of Politics and Law, in Shanghai.
South Central Institute of Political Science and Law, today known as Zhongnan University of Economics and Law, in Wuhan.
Northwest Institute of Political Science and Law, today known as Northwest University of Political Science and Law(), in Xi'an.
Since the late 1990s, the above five universities and institutes are no longer administered by the Ministry of Justice. Each university has 500-800 teaching staff and over 5000 law students. Aside from training future lawyers and judges, they provide on-job training programs for those involved with the law.
And "the Four Departments" are:
People's University of China Department of Law, today known as Renmin University of China School of Law, in Beijing.
Peking University Department of Law, today known as Peking University Law School, in Beijing.
Wuhan University Department of Law, today known as Wuhan University Law School, in Wuhan.
Jilin University Department of Law, today known as Jilin University School of Law, in Changchun.

College level 
A feature of the Chinese legal training system is the network of specialized on-job internal training colleges and centers. The Supreme People's Court administers two training institutes: the National Judges College and the SPC Spare-time University, both located in Beijing. Its trainees are mostly judges or incoming judges. Starting from 2003, however, receiving a diploma from these institutions will no longer be sufficient. Those who want to become a judge need to have a university-level education. There is also a National Prosecutors College, whose trainees are mostly senior prosecutors. These three institutions also have local branches in all the provinces.

A provincial bureau of justice usually manages a justice training centre in a college of justice, which provides college level training for young students or periodic training to practicing lawyers. In addition, there are provincial-level "schools of the administration of political and legal cadres", which provide a legal training program to judges, prosecutors, justice officials and practicing lawyers.

In addition, the national broadcaster CCTV runs a "Television University" which has a long-distance college-level law program. At the provincial level, there are post-secondary justice colleges or junior colleges, which provide legal education mostly to junior supporting staff in legal institutions.

Implementation of law

Equality and justice 
Since 1978, the government has departed significantly from its focus on class status, and replaced it with a qualified presumption of equality. The principle of legal equality is enshrined in basic laws such as the Economic Contract Law (1982), which provides that contracting parties enjoy equal rights, the General Principles of Civil Law (1987), which ascribes various rights universally to all natural persons, and the Administrative Litigation Law (1989), which allows any citizen to file suit against administrative agencies. However, the doctrine does not extend to the right of labour to engage in collective bargaining or strike action.

The PRC constitution and laws provide principles for fundamental human rights, but there is general agreement, even among members of the government, that many of these rights are just in principle not fully implemented. There is, however, considerable disagreement over which rights require the most attention and how the PRC should address these deficiencies. In particular, the Chinese government tends to argue that major improvements in China's human rights record can be made within the context of leadership of the Chinese Communist Party, while many both in China and outside of the government argue that any real improvement is impossible without fundamental changes in the political system.
(See human rights in the People's Republic of China)

The expansion of the legal profession has been beneficial for legal awareness. As of 2002, there have been established 2,156 legal aid centres staffed by over 7000 full-time legal professionals. According to the Ministry of Justice, this system will continue to expand, given that "establishing a legal aid system" is a priority of the Chinese government as outlined by the 10th Five-Year Plan (adopted April 2002).

Hong Kong and Macau 
The legal systems of the Hong Kong Special Administrative Region and the Macau Special Administrative Region are excepted from the legal framework of Mainland China by the doctrine of "one country, two systems" established by Deng Xiaoping. The NPC of the PRC enacted the Basic Law of Hong Kong SAR (April 1990) and Basic Law of Macau SAR (March 1993) to ensure state sovereignty and at the same time the special economic position of those two regions. Since both statutes are national laws, no local laws, including ordinances, administrative regulations and other normative documents, can violate the Basic Law.

The Basic Law of both regions states that the existing capitalist system and the people's way of life shall remain unchanged for at least 50 years, and the laws previously in force shall be maintained. In Hong Kong, the legal system is based on English Common Law and Macau based on Portuguese civil law.

See also 

 List of statutes of the People's Republic of China
 People's Republic of China's trademark law
 Legal systems of the world

References

Further reading 

 English
Albert H.Y. Chen, "An Introduction to the Legal System of the People's Republic of China", Hong Kong: Lexis Nexis, 2011.
  - Published online on March 25, 2014
Wang Chengguang and Zhang Xianchu, Introduction to Chinese Law. Hong Kong: Sweet & Maxwell Asia, 1997.
Laws and regulations of the People's Republic of China, Volume 1, compiled by the Legislative Affairs Office of the State Council, Beijing, China : China Legal Pub. House, 2001-, 16 volumes.

 Chinese
Chen Shouyi, Faxue jichu lilun 法学基础理论 (Theories on the Basis of Legal Science). Beijing: Beijing Daxue Chubanshe (Beijing University Press), 1984.
Shen Zongling (ed.), Fali xue 法理学 (Jurisprudence). Taipei: Wunan Book Publisher, 1994.

External links

Chinese 
CEI Chinese Law and Regulation (国信中国法律网) Hosted by the State Information Centre, a Chinese central government agency. Includes two major databases covering laws and regulations of the PRC from 1949 to the present.
Legal Daily 法制日报

English 
China Law Blog Chinese law and the legal issues of doing business in China.
Free online P.R. China law library In Both English and Chinese
China Legislative Information Network Systemlaw Web.
Judicial System of PRC Official Site sponsored by the Supreme People's Court with judicial news, library of laws and regulations, both in English and Chinese.
Complete Research Guide to the Laws of the People's Republic of China (PRC) Maintained by Wei Luo and Joan Liu, both law librarians at major US universities. A thorough introduction to both print and electronic resources on the law of the PRC.